Cajuata (Aymara: Kaqwata) is a location in the La Paz Department in Bolivia. It is the seat of the Cajuata Municipality, the third municipal section of the Inquisivi Province.

References 

Populated places in La Paz Department (Bolivia)